The 1989 Fordham Rams football team was an American football team that represented Fordham University as a member of the Patriot League during the 1989 NCAA Division I-AA football season. In its fourth season under head coach Larry Glueck, the team compiled a 2–6 record and played its home games at Jack Coffey Field in The Bronx.

The 1989 season marked Fordham's return to major college football after an absence of 35 years.  Fordham had been a Division III playoff team in both 1987 and 1988. The school launched a $150 million capital campaign in 1989 that included a plan to build a $20 million stadium.

Senior back Rick Hollawell concluded his college football career holding Fordham records with 36 touchdowns and 4,299 all-purpose yards.

Schedule

References

Fordham
Fordham Rams football seasons
Fordham Rams football